The Blue Ribbon Award for Best Actress is as part of its annual Blue Ribbon Awards for Japanese film, to recognize a female actor who has delivered an outstanding performance in a leading role. The award was first given in 1954 for the films released in preceding year 1950.

List of winners

External links
Blue Ribbon Awards on IMDb

Awards established in 1950
Recurring events established in 1950
1950 establishments in Japan
Actress
Film awards for lead actress